Palm nut soup or banga is a soup made from  palm fruit and it is common in the Ghanaian, Nigerian and Ivorian communities. The soup is made from a palm cream or palm nut base. The palm cream is combined with flavorful marinated meats, smoked dried fish, and aromatics to create a rich, deeply flavored soup that can be eaten with starch, fufu, omotuo, banku, fonio, or rice. Palm oil is very significant to Nigerian, Ghanaian and other West African cuisine.

By region

Cameroon 

 soup is a palm fruit soup in Cameroonian cuisine and West African cuisine. It is often served with kwacoco. The soup is Cameroon's version of the West African banga, a palm fruit soup eaten in areas including parts of Nigeria. In Cameroon  is made using fresh palm nuts. Outside the area canned nuts can be used.

Nigeria 

 is a type of palm fruit soup from Southern (the Niger Delta) Nigeria, particularly the Urhobo ethnic group.

In Nigeria, the delicacy is used to accompany other dishes such as Starch (Usi) for the Urhobo people of Delta State, Nigeria.  The Igbo people have the stew and soup varieties made from palm fruits. Ofe akwu is the stew variety usually taken with  rice while the palm fruit extract is used especially in Anambra region of Igbo land to prepare Oha and Onugbu soup accompanied with moulding foods (popularly known as 'swallow') e.g. pounded cassava (utara/akpu), corn/cassava flour (nni oka). The palm fruit is notably important to the Igbo people.

The palm fruit is often harvested from locally grown palm fruit trees, after which it is thoroughly washed, boiled and mashed for the extraction of its oil which is the main ingredient in the preparation of the Banga soup.

The soup is eaten with Starch made with Cassava Starch and palm-oil or rice in the south south or south eastern parts of Nigeria . Banga Soup is mostly prepared using fresh catfish (fresh fish Banga soup) dried/smoked fish or meat.

The soup can also make a delicious dish with the addition of Okra vegetable.

Amiedi, also known as banga soup, is a soup eaten by the Urhobo people of Southern Nigeria. It is made by extracting the liquid of palm kernels. Thereafter, other ingredients like crayfish, meat, fish, pepper and cow tripe are added. It is eaten with eba or usi (starch). (Elaeis guineensis) extract.

Gallery

See also 

 Groundnut soup
 Kpekpele
 List of soups

References

External links 
Palm nut soup recipe
Palm Nut Soup
Video: How to make Palmnut Soup (GH)

Fruit soups
Cameroonian cuisine
Ghanaian cuisine
Nigerian soups